Robert Galloway and Alex Lawson were the reigning champions but chose to defend their title with different partners. Galloway partnered Jackson Withrow but lost in the final to William Blumberg and Max Schnur. Lawson partnered Reese Stalder but lost in the semifinals to Galloway and Withrow.

Blumberg and Schnur won the title after defeating Galloway and Withrow 6–3, 7–6(7–4) in the final.

Seeds

Draw

References

External links
 Main draw

Cleveland Challenger - Doubles
Cleveland Open